Ingelore Kremtz ( Bahls; born 18 June 1943) is a retired German rower who won a gold, a silver and a bronze medal in the quadruple sculls at the European championships of 1966, 1968 and 1969, respectively. She works as a physiotherapist in Berlin. She was married to the rower Peter Kremtz.

References

1943 births
Living people
East German female rowers
European Rowing Championships medalists